John Grant may refer to:

Entertainment
 John Grant (author) (1949–2020), pseudonym used by science fiction writer Paul Le Page Barnett
 John Grant (children's author) (1930–2014), Scottish writer and illustrator known for the Littlenose series
 John Grant (novelist) (born 1933), writes under the pen name Jonathan Gash
 John Grant (pipe-major) (1876–1961), Scottish bagpipe player
 John Grant (musician) (born 1968), lead vocalist with The Czars
 John Grant (screenwriter) (1891–1955), wrote for Abbott and Costello
 John Grant (born 1960), pseudonym Jock Strap, vocalist with London punk band The Straps
 John Moreau Grant (1895–1986), Canadian naval officer
 Johnny Grant (radio personality) (1923–2008), American radio personality
 John Grant, character in Action for Slander
 John Grant, character in Wake in Fright

Military
 John Duncan Grant (1877–1967), British soldier
 John Gildroy Grant (1889–1970), New Zealand soldier
 John Robert Grant (1729–1790), British soldier, American Loyalist and the first British settler of Summerville, Nova Scotia
 John Grant (Royal Navy officer) (1908–1996), admiral who commanded the Reserve Fleet of the Royal Navy
 Johannes Grant, Scottish engineer who fought in the Siege of Constantinople

Politics
 John Gaston Grant (1858–1923), U.S. Representative from North Carolina
 John Grant (British diplomat) (born 1954), British diplomat and head of the UK's Mission to the European Union
 John Grant (British politician) (1932–2000), British Labour and SDP Member of Parliament
 John Grant (Gunpowder Plot) (c. 1570–1606), one of the conspirators in the Gunpowder Plot
 John Grant (Manchester politician), Manchester councillor for Whalley Range
 John Grant (Australian politician) (1857–1928), Australian Senator
 John Grant (Queensland politician) (born 1954), member of the Legislative Assembly of Queensland from 2012 to 2015
 John Grant (Canadian politician) (1841–1919), Scottish-born merchant and political figure in British Columbia
 John James Grant (born 1936), Lieutenant Governor of Nova Scotia
 John Peter Grant (MP) (1774–1848), Scottish politician
 John Grant, 13th Earl of Dysart (born 1946), Scottish peer, landowner and conservationist
 John Peter Grant (1807–1893), British colonial administrator

Sports
 John Grant (American football) (born 1950)
 John Grant (Scottish footballer) (1931–2021)
 John Grant (footballer, born 1891), English
 John Grant (footballer, born 1981), English
 John Grant (rugby league) (born 1950), Australian
 John Grant (cricketer) (born 1941), Australian
 John Grant Jr. (born 1974), Canadian lacrosse player
 Jackie Grant (1907–1978), West Indian cricketer

Other
 John Grant (priest) (fl. 1731–1744), Archdeacon of Barnstaple
 John Grant (neurosurgeon) (1922–2013), neurosurgeon and disability sport administrator
 John C. Boileau Grant (1886–1973), British-Canadian anatomist
 John Marion Grant (1961–2021), American convict executed in Oklahoma
 John T. Grant (1813–1887), American railroad builder
 John T. Grant (judge) (1920–2010), justice of the Nebraska Supreme Court.
 John W. Grant (1867–1938), Atlanta merchant and banker in the late 19th century

See also
Jack Grant (disambiguation)
Johnny Grant (disambiguation)
Johnson Grant (1773–1844), Scottish divine